11001 was one of the first British Railways diesel locomotives, built in 1949 at British Railways' Ashford railway works. It was designed by O. V. S. Bulleid when he was Chief Mechanical Engineer of the Southern Railway. It was powered by a Paxman RPH Series 1 engine, capable of delivering  at 1,250 rpm. It was driven via a Vulcan-Sinclair fluid coupling to an SSS (synchro-self-shifting) Powerflow gearbox. It had a 0-6-0 wheel formation, driven by rods from a rear jackshaft on the final drive, and with Bulleid's favoured BFB wheels.

Its main duties were on branch lines and shunting, working dwindling goods services on the Caterham line during the 1950s. It was allocated to Norwood Shed, but also has been photographed in Swindon.

It was withdrawn in August 1959, and scrapped at Ashford Works in December.

Oddly, the locomotive's controls were laid out as in a steam locomotive, perhaps because there were at that time few drivers with experience of driving diesel engines. There are no known photographs of the interior.

In fiction
Dennis and Norman, from Thomas & Friends, are based on the  locomotive.

References

External links

 

 11001
C locomotives
Individual locomotives of Great Britain
Railway locomotives introduced in 1949
Scrapped locomotives
Unique locomotives
Standard gauge locomotives of Great Britain